Quartet is a 1948 British anthology film with four segments, each based on a story by W. Somerset Maugham. The author appears at the start and end of the movie to introduce the stories and comment about his writing career. It was successful enough to produce two sequels, Trio (1950) and Encore (1951), and popularised the compendium film format, leading to films such as O. Henry's Full House in 1952.

The screenplays for the stories were all written by R. C. Sherriff.

The Facts of Life
Based on "The Facts of Life", included in the 1940 collection of Maugham stories The Mixture as Before.

 Director: Ralph Smart
 Cinematographer: Ray Elton

Cast
 Jack Watling as Nicky
 Mai Zetterling as Jeanne
 Basil Radford as Henry Garnet
 Angela Baddeley as Mrs. Garnet
 Naunton Wayne as Leslie
 Ian Fleming as Ralph
 Jack Raine as Thomas
 James Robertson Justice as Branksome

Plot
Despite their reservations, Mr. and Mrs. Garnet allow their promising tennis player son, nineteen-year-old Nicky Garnet, to travel by himself to Monte Carlo to compete in a tournament. Mr. Garnet gives him some advice: never gamble, never lend money, and don't have anything to do with women. On the last night of his stay, he disregards all three: he wins a large amount of money at roulette and meets a beautiful woman named Jeanne, who borrows from him before he can react. Later, she repays him, then takes him dancing at a nightclub.

It is so late, his hotel has closed for the night. She offers to let him sleep on her sofa. Later that night, he awakens to find her stealing his winnings. He pretends to be asleep and sees her hide the money in a vase. After she leaves, he retrieves the money. The next morning, on the plane returning home, he counts his money and finds there is more than there should be. A friend suggests that Jeanne had stored her own funds in the same hiding place.

Upon his return home, his father laments to his friends that his son ignored everything he had told him and profited from it.

The Alien Corn
 Director: Harold French
 Cinematographer: Ray Elton

Cast
 Dirk Bogarde as George Bland
 Raymond Lovell as Sir Frederick Bland
 Irene Browne as Lady Bland
 Honor Blackman as Paula
 Françoise Rosay as Lea Markart
 Mary Hinton as Aunt Maud

Plot
On George Bland's twenty-first birthday, his father, of the landed gentry, asks him what he intends to do with his life. George's answer is incomprehensible to his entire family: he wants to become a concert pianist. His family, who want him to succeed to his father's place and title, try to talk him out of it. Finally, his cousin Paula (who is in love with him) comes up with a compromise: he will study in Paris for two years, after which an impartial expert will determine whether he has it in him to reach his goal.

The two years ended, Paula gets Lea Markart, a world-famous pianist, to do the judging. After listening to George's recital, Markart tells him that, while his technique is excellent, he lacks the talent and inspiration of a true artist and could never be more than a good amateur.

George is killed later that day with a blast to the chest from a gun he was supposedly cleaning. His family is anxious that his death be ruled accidental, and, at the inquest, the coroner's jury returns such a verdict with clear consciences, since, in the words of the plainspoken foreman, the jurors cannot accept that a gentleman such as the deceased would have killed himself "just 'cause he couldn't play piano good".

The Kite
Based on "The Kite", included in the 1947 collection of Maugham stories Creatures of Circumstance.

 Director: Arthur Crabtree
 Cinematographer: Ray Elton

Cast
 George Cole as Herbert Sunbury
 Hermione Baddeley as Beatrice Sunbury
 Susan Shaw as Betty
 Mervyn Johns as Samuel Sunbury
 Bernard Lee as Prison Visitor

Plot
Herbert Sunbury marries Betty, despite his overly involved mother's dislike for the woman. The newlyweds are happy, except for Herbert's lifelong enthusiasm for flying kites. Herbert and his father had designed and flown their creations every Saturday on the common since Herbert was a young lad. Betty considers it childish, so to appease her, Herbert reluctantly promises to give it up. However, the lure of his latest, giant, unflown kite proves too great for him. When Betty finds out, they have a fight and Herbert moves back in with his parents, much to his mother's delight.

Betty has second thoughts and tries to make up with her husband, but he refuses to go home with her. Out of anger, she destroys his new kite. Aghast, Herbert angrily refuses to give her any further financial support and is put in prison as a result.

A prison visitor is told his curious story. He arranges for Herbert to be released and advises Betty on how to save her marriage. When Herbert goes to the common, he discovers Betty there flying a kite.

The Colonel's Lady
Based on "The Colonel's Lady", included in the 1947 collection of Maugham stories Creatures of Circumstance.

 Director: Ken Annakin
 Cinematographer: Reg Wyer

Cast
 Cecil Parker as Colonel George Peregrine 
 Nora Swinburne as Evie Peregrine
 Wilfrid Hyde-White as 2nd. Club Man
 Ernest Thesiger as Henry Dashwood
 Henry Edwards as Duke of Heverel
 Linden Travers as Daphne 
 Felix Aylmer as Martin

Plot
A colonel's mousy wife writes a book of poetry under a pseudonym, but is immediately unmasked by the papers. The colonel does not read the poetry (although he says he has) and is surprised when a friend says it is "not suitable for children". Another friend says it has "naked, earthy passion", and compares it to Sappho. The book is a success and sells "like hot-cakes", becoming the talk of the town. Even the colonel's mistress has an interest in it.

After listening to much talk about how "sexy" the book is, the colonel finally asks his mistress to borrow her copy, then insists she tell him about it. The book is about a middle-aged woman falling in love with, and having an affair with, a younger man, told in the first person. After a torrid affair, the younger man dies. The mistress says it is so vivid that it must be based on a real experience, but the colonel insists his wife is "too much of a lady", and that it must be fiction. Still, he is tortured by the insinuation that it could be true but is too afraid to ask his wife about it.

Eventually, of course, sensing his unease, she tells him the passion was based on his love for her, as it was when they were young. She blames herself for the "death" of that love. They end in an embrace.

References

External links
 
 

1948 films
1948 comedy-drama films
British comedy-drama films
British anthology films
Films based on short fiction
Films directed by Ken Annakin
Films directed by Arthur Crabtree
Films directed by Harold French
Films directed by Ralph Smart
Films based on multiple works
Films based on works by W. Somerset Maugham
British black-and-white films
1940s English-language films
1940s British films